Timpano may refer to:

The Italian, Spanish and Portuguese words for eardrum
The singular of Timpani
Timballo, an Italian baked pasta dish
Jacob Timpano, Australian association football defender